Galarrwuy Yunupingu  (born 30 June 1948), also known as James Galarrwuy Yunupingu and Dr Yunupingu, is a leader in the Aboriginal Australian community, and has been involved in the fight for Indigenous land rights in Australia throughout his career. He is a Yolngu man of the Gumatj clan, from Arnhem Land in the Northern Territory. He was the 1978 Australian of the Year.

Early life and education
He was born at Melville Bay, near Yirrkala, on 30 June 1948, and is a member of the Gumatj clan of the Yolngu people. He attended the Mission School at Yirrkala in his formative years, and moved to Brisbane to study at the Methodist Bible College for two years, returning to Gove in 1967.

Career

Land rights

In the early 1960s, with his father, Gumatj clan leader Mungurrawuy, he entered the struggle for land rights, and helped draw up the Yirrkala bark petitions. He came to national attention in the late 1960s for his role in the landmark, but unsuccessful Gove Land Rights Case. This legal action was the first by Indigenous Australians to challenge mining companies' rights to exploit traditional lands. He became a prominent leader and strong voice on behalf of Aboriginal people in the Northern Territory and Australia, gaining respect and admiration from many. In 1969 he was elected to the Yirrkala town council.

In 1975 he joined the Northern Land Council (NLC), the authority appointed under the Aboriginal Land Rights Act 1976 to represent traditional Aboriginal landowners and Aboriginal people. He was chairman of the NLC from 1977 to 1980, an executive member until 1983 when he was re-elected as chairman. He has led a number of negotiations with mining and government bodies.

As chair of the NLC, he led the Gagudju people in negotiations with mining and government bodies. Not opposed to mining in principle, Yunupingu sees it as a way for Aboriginal people to escape the welfare trap if it is conducted on the traditional owners' terms. These include a fair distribution of the economic benefits and respect for the land and specific sacred sites. He said: "We will continue to fight for the right to make our own decisions about our own land".

21st century
In October 2004, Yunupingu resigned from his position as chair of the NLC after 23 years in the role and around 28 as a member of the council. In June 2005 The Weekend Australian, based on information provided by his son and other relatives, reported that there was some discontent among the Yunupingu family and other community members about the distribution of mining royalties paid to the Gumatj Association.

In 2007 Yunupingu spoke about the need for action in reducing Indigenous poverty. In reference to the Howard government's Northern Territory National Emergency Response, known as "The Intervention, he said "The intervention was an incomplete process about which he would reserve his judgement until he knew what was working and what wasn't". In 2009 he spoke out against the inability of the government to provide adequate housing.

As of early 2009, he continued to live near Yirrkala, fulfilling his role a senior ceremonial leader and community elder. He still held numerous positions on committees and organisations where he was able to share his wide experience with other Australians and promote the aspirations of his people.

In January 2010 he spent time in hospital after collapsing in a bank in Nhulunbuy. In late 2016, he had a kidney transplant.

In November 2019, it was announced that Yunupingu would be one of 20 members of the Senior Advisory Group to help co-design the Indigenous voice to government set up by Ken Wyatt, the Minister for Indigenous Australians. The Group is co-chaired by Wyatt, Marcia Langton and Tom Calma.

Recognition
In 1978 Yunupingu was named Australian of the Year for his negotiations on the Ranger uranium mine agreement. He said the award 'would help him to shake off the image of ratbag and radical' and would give him 'greater strength as an individual and as a leader'. It was also a recognition for Aboriginal people as 'the indigenous people of this country who must share in its future'.

In the Australia Day Honours in 1985, James Galarrwuy Yunupingu was made a Member of the Order of Australia (AM) for his services to the Aboriginal community.

In 1998 Yunupingu was added to the list of 100 "Australian Living National Treasures" selected by the National Trust of Australia as leaders in society "considered to have a great influence over our environment because of the standards and examples they set".

In 2015, at the Garma Festival, he was honoured by the University of Melbourne with an Honorary Doctor of Laws (LL.D.). In a statement, Professor Margaret Sheil, Provost at the University of Melbourne, said the Honorary Doctor of Laws award to Yunupingu was to recognise and celebrate the significance of his work for Indigenous rights. She said, "The Honorary Doctor of Laws is the University's highest academic honour. ... Dr Yunupingu's relentless struggle for land rights and advocacy for the agency of his people have profoundly advanced the interests of Aboriginal and Torres Strait Islander people throughout Australia. ... Dr Yunupingu has received the award of the Doctor of Laws honoris causa in recognition of the fire he has lit that will blaze ever brighter until Indigenous people secure their self-evident rights to property, their own way of life, economic independence and control over their lives and the future of their children."

In May 2017 Yunupingu was one of three Indigenous Australians, along with Tom Calma and Lowitja O'Donoghue,  honoured by Australia Post in the 2017 Legends Commemorative Stamp "Indigenous leaders" series to mark the 50th anniversary of the 1967 referendum.

References

Further reading

External links

1948 births
Living people
People from the Northern Territory
Australian indigenous rights activists
Members of the Order of Australia
Australian of the Year Award winners
Yolngu people